Notker the Stammerer ( – 6 April 912), Notker Balbulus, or simply Notker, was a Benedictine monk at the Abbey of Saint Gall active as a poet, scholar and (probably) composer. Described as "a significant figure in the Western Church", Notker made substantial contributions to both the music and literature of his time. He is usually credited with two major works of the Carolingian period: the Liber Hymnorum, which includes an important collection of early sequences, and the earliest biography of Charlemagne, Gesta Caroli Magni. His other works include a biography of Saint Gall, the Vita Sancti Galli, and a martyrology.

Born near the Abbey of Saint Gall, Notker was educated alongside the monks Tuotilo and Ratpert; all three were composers, making the Abbey an important center of early medieval music. Notker quickly became a central figure of the Abbey and among the leading literary scholars of the Early Middle Ages. A renowned teacher, he taught Solomon III, the bishop of Constance and on occasion advised Charles the Fat. Although venerated by the Abbey of Saint Gall and the namesake of later scholars there such as Notker Physicus and Notker Labeo, Notker was never formally canonized. He was given "the Stammerer" as an epithet, due to his lifelong stutter.

Life and career
Notker was born around 840, near the Abbey of Saint Gall in modern-day Switzerland. His family was wealthy and of either Alemannic or Swiss descent and they owned land in Jonschwil of Thurgau. Notker's later biographer Ekkehard V claims he was born in Heiligau—now Elgg—in the Canton of Zürich, but this has been rejected by the historian , who suggests a birthplace near Jonschwil. Since childhood Notker had a stutter, resulting in the Latin epithet  or "the Stammerer" in English. He began schooling at Saint Gall early in age and spent the rest of his life in the Abbey. His teachers included the Swiss monk  and the Irish monk Moengal, called "Marcellus" by Notker. The later Casus monasterii Sancti Galli of Ekkehard IV "paints a lively picture of the monastery school", and notes that Notker was taught alongside Tuotilo and Ratpert; all three would become teachers at the Abbey.

Although first and foremost a scholar, Notker held numerous positions at the Abby including librarian in 890 and master of guests in 892 and 894. He became established as a well-known teacher and was eventually appointed "master of the monastic school". Among his students was Solomon, was later Bishop of Constance from  890 until his death in 912. Notker was often called upon for council from outside the Abbey; on occasion he advised Charles the Fat who visited the Abbey from 4–6 December 883. Charles was the dedicatee of Notker's Gesta Karoli, the earliest biography on Charlemagne. Ekkehard IV lauded him as "delicate of body but not of mind, stuttering of tongue but not of intellect, pushing boldly forward in things Divine, a vessel of the Holy Spirit without equal in his time". 

Despite his renown in the Abbey, Notker never became an abbot of Saint Gall, and repeatedly declined abbacy offers elsewhere. Notker died in Saint Gall on 6 April 912.

Musical works

His Liber Hymnorum, created between 881 and 887, is an early collection of Sequences, which he called "hymns", mnemonic poems for remembering the series of pitches sung during a melisma in plainchant, especially in the Alleluia. It is unknown how many or which of the works contained in the collection are his. The hymn Media Vita was erroneously attributed to him late in the Middle Ages. In the preface to his Liber Hymnorum, Notker claimed his musical work was inspired by an antiphoner that was brought to Gall from the Jumièges Abbey, soon after its destruction in 851.

Ekkehard IV wrote of fifty sequences composed by Notker. He was formerly considered to have been the inventor of the sequence, a new species of religious lyric, but this is now considered doubtful, though he did introduce the genre into Germany. It had been the custom to prolong the Alleluia in the Mass before the Gospel, modulating through a skillfully harmonized series of tones. Notker learned how to fit the separate syllables of a Latin text to the tones of this jubilation; this poem was called the sequence (q.v.), formerly called the "jubilation". (The reason for this name is uncertain.) From 881–7 Notker dedicated a collection of such verses to Bishop Liutward of Vercelli, but it is not known which or how many are his.

Literary works
He completed Erchanbert's chronicle, arranged a martyrology, composed a metrical biography of Saint Gall, and authored other works.

Gesta Caroli Magni
The "Monk of Saint Gall" (Latin: Monachus Sangallensis; the name is not contemporary, being given by modern scholars), the ninth-century writer of a volume of didactic eulogistic anecdotes regarding the Emperor Charlemagne, is now commonly believed to be Notker the Stammerer. This monk is known from his work to have been a native German-speaker, deriving from the Thurgau, only a few miles from the Abbey of Saint Gall; the region is also close to where Notker is believed to have derived from. The monk himself relates that he was raised by Adalbert, a former soldier who had fought against the Saxons, the Avars ("Huns" in his text) and the Slavs under the command of Kerold, brother of Hildegard, Charlemagne's second wife; he was also a friend of Adalbert's son, Werinbert, another monk at Saint Gall, who died as the book was in progress. His teacher was Grimald von Weißenburg, the Abbot of Saint Gall from 841 to 872, who was, the monk claims, himself a pupil of Alcuin.

The monk's untitled work, referred to by modern scholars as De Carolo Magno ("Concerning Charles the Great") or Gesta Caroli Magni ("The Deeds of Charles the Great"), is not a biography but consists instead of two books of anecdotes relating chiefly to the Emperor Charlemagne and his family, whose virtues are insistently invoked. It was written for Charles the Fat, great-grandson of Charlemagne, who visited Saint Gall in 883. It has been scorned by traditional historians, who refer to the Monk as one who "took pleasure in amusing anecdotes and witty tales, but who was ill-informed about the true march of historical events", and describe the work itself as a "mass of legend, saga, invention and reckless blundering": historical figures are claimed as living when in fact dead; claims are attributed to false sources (in one instance, the Monk claims that "to this King Pepin [the Short] the learned Bede has devoted almost an entire book of his Ecclesiastical History"; no such account exists in Bede's history – unsurprisingly, given that Bede died in 735 during the reign of Charlemagne's grandfather Charles Martel); and Saint Gall is frequently referenced as a location in anecdotes, regardless of historical verisimilitude (Pepin the Hunchback, for example, is supposed to have been sent to Saint Gall as punishment for his rebellion, and – in a trope owed to Livy's tale of Tarquin and the poppies – earns a promotion to rich Prüm Abbey after advising Charlemagne through an implicit parable of hoeing thistles to execute another group of rebels). The Monk also mocks and criticizes bishops and the prideful, high-born incompetent, showy in dress and fastidious and lazy in habits, whilst lauding the wise and skillful government of the Emperor with nods to the deserving poor. Several of the Monk's tales, such as that of the nine rings of the Avar stronghold, have been used in modern biographies of Charlemagne.

Martyrology
In his martyrology, Notker appeared to corroborate one of St Columba's miracles. St Columba, being an important father of Irish monasticism, was also important to St Gall and thus to Notker's own monastery. Adomnan of Iona had written that at one point Columba had through clairvoyance seen a city in Italy near Rome being destroyed by fiery sulphur as a divine punishment and that three thousand people had perished. And shortly after Columba saw this, sailors from Gaul arrived to tell the news of it. Notker claimed in his martyrology that this event happened and that an earthquake had destroyed a city which was called 'new'. It is unclear what this city was that Notker was claiming, although some thought it may have been Naples (previously called 'Neapolis' – new city). However Naples was destroyed by a volcano in 512 before Columba was born, and not during Columba's lifetime.

Others
Notker completed the Breviarium Regum Francorum ("Breviary of the Frankish Kings") begun by Erchanbert.

Legacy
Scholars vary on evaluating Notker's main legacy; the priest Alban Butler asserted that his sequences were his most important achievement, while the historian Rosamond McKitterick states that he is best remembered for the Gesta Caroli Magni. Notker and Solomon II were the most important writers educated at Saint Gall, and Notker was among the both leading literary scribes and scholars of his time. He was the namesake of the later scholars Notker Physicus and Notker Labeo, who are referred to as "Notker II" and "Notker III" respectively.

On Notker's canonization status, the English cleric John Donne noted that "he is a private Saint, for a few Parishes". According to the 16th century historian Henricus Canisius, Notker' Sainthood was granted by Leo X in 1512 for Saint Gall and nearby churches, and in 1513 for the Diocese of Constance. In Saint Gall and other churches he is commemorated annually on 6 April. Notker was never formally canonized.

In the mid-19th century the Swiss music scholar Anselm Schubiger was the first to transcribe almost all of Notker's extant melodies into modern notation. Many of his transcriptions are still in use, though older manuscript sources are available now that Schubiger did not have access to, meaning that "a more comprehensive approach to the sources will produce readings that are closer to Notker's own use, and better musically".

References

Notes

Citations

Sources

Further reading

External links
 
 Notker's commentary on The Consolation of Philosophy by Boethius from e-codices.com
 
 

840s births
912 deaths
Year of birth uncertain
Frankish Benedictines
10th-century Latin writers
Medieval Latin poets
9th-century Latin writers
Beatified people
Frankish historians
9th-century Christian monks
10th-century Christian monks
Benedictine monks
Writers from the Carolingian Empire
Carolingian poets
9th-century composers
10th-century composers